Dymokury is a municipality and village in Nymburk District in the Central Bohemian Region of the Czech Republic. It has about 900 inhabitants.

Administrative parts
Villages of Černá Hora and Svídnice are administrative parts of Dymokury.

Geography
It lies in the Central Elbe Table. Two streams, Pivovarský and Štítarský, flow through the municipality. The Štítarský Stream supplies the Pustý Pond.

History
The first written mention of Dymokury is from 1249, when it was a possession of a local noble Soběslav. In 1290, King Wenceslaus II ceded the estates to the Cistercian monks of the Sedlec Abbey near Kutná Hora. After changing owners several times, the fief was purchased by the noble House of Waldstein in 1573, their successors had a Renaissance castle erected from 1614 onwards.

Disseized by Emperor Ferdinand II after the 1620 Battle of White Mountain, Dymokury was acquired by Albrecht von Wallenstein, who nevertheless sold it to the Austrian Khuen von Belasi dynasty shortly afterwards. They resold it to Guillaume de Lamboy, Baron of Cortesheim. From 1673, the House of Colloredo held the manor, which also included the neighbouring town of Městec Králové. They had the castle again rebuilt in a Baroque style, finished in 1787. The last owners are the Counts of Czernin, who were expropriated and expelled after World War II, but regained its possession. The castle was restored after the Velvet Revolution of 1989.

Demographics

Economy
The local economy mainly depends on agriculture. It is mainly a residential village and only a few residents work in Dymokury.

Sights

The landmark of Dymokury is the Church of the Annunciation of the Virgin Mary. The first church in Dymokury was documented in the 14th century, it was destroyed during the Thirty Years' War. The current church was then built in the Baroque style in 1723–1725. It was probably designed by Jan Santini Aichel.

Notable people
Ottokar Czernin (1872–1932), nobleman, diplomat and politician
Count Otto von Czernin (1875–1962), nobleman and diplomat

References

External links

Villages in Nymburk District